Per Dahl may refer to:

 Per Dahl (musicologist) (born 1953), Norwegian musicologist
 Per Dahl (ice hockey) (1916–1989), Norwegian ice hockey player
 Per Arne Dahl (born 1950), Norwegian author and bishop of Tunsberg
 Per Kristian Dahl (born 1960), Norwegian politician